First Presbyterian Church is a historic Presbyterian church at 410 Avenue A in Palestine, Texas.

Its congregation was organized in 1849, a year after Palestine was founded.

The Gothic Revival church building was built in 1887–88, and is the oldest church in Palestine continuously serving a congregation.

The church was added to the National Register of Historic Places in 1998.

See also

National Register of Historic Places listings in Anderson County, Texas
Recorded Texas Historic Landmarks in Anderson County

References

External links

Gothic Revival church buildings in Texas
Churches completed in 1887
19th-century Presbyterian church buildings in the United States
Churches in Anderson County, Texas
Churches on the National Register of Historic Places in Texas
Presbyterian churches in Texas
Wesley Clark Dodson buildings
National Register of Historic Places in Anderson County, Texas
Recorded Texas Historic Landmarks